The Wilder Park Conservatory is a conservatory and botanical garden located in Wilder Park at 225 Prospect Avenue in Elmhurst, Illinois. Situated on a  lot, the conservatory shares the land with three greenhouses (not open to the public), the open air Elizabeth Gardens, and the Wilder mansion, which was the former location of the Elmhurst Public Library. An addition was added to the mansion in the 1960s to increase library space, but the addition was removed during a restoration which was completed in 2008.

The one-room Conservatory is open daily from 8am to 4pm; admittance is free, although donations are noted to be welcome. A mature Pachypodium and a tree Opuntia are the highlights. The conservatory also features a small pond with goldfish. Located nearby are the new Elmhurst Public Library, the Elmhurst Art Museum, and Elmhurst University's Schaible Science Center.

The conservatory's origins date back to 1868, when Seth Wadhams purchased a treeless farm, planting trees and building a greenhouse for his wife, which is still in use today. Subsequent owners (among them Aurelia King and her daughter-in-law, Louisa Boyd Yeomans King) continued to develop the site's gardens. The property was transferred to city ownership around 1920, and in 1923 the Elmhurst Park District Board added a conservatory to the original greenhouse. In 1926 a second greenhouse was added.

See also 
 List of botanical gardens in the United States

References

External links 
 Elmhurst Park District Wilder Park

Botanical gardens in Illinois
Elmhurst, Illinois
Tourist attractions in DuPage County, Illinois
Protected areas of DuPage County, Illinois
Greenhouses in Illinois
1920s establishments in Illinois